Archway School is a comprehensive co-educational school for pupils aged 11 to 18 in Stroud, Gloucestershire, England. The headteacher is Kieron Smith.

Archway Secondary Modern School, Paganhill, Stroud was built on land compulsorily purchased from EJ Wheeler of Park Farm and from part of the Farmhill Park Estate. The latter was the home in the 1830s of magistrate Henry Wyatt (1793-1847) who built the gate archway (which gives the School its name) as a commemoration of the abolition of slavery.

The School received its first pupils in September 1961 and was one of the first comprehensive schools in the Stroud area. The first Headteacher was Mr SGH Loosely who was pictured on the school's opening day with Head Boy Gerald Butler and Head Girl Gillian Wood. It was officially opened on Friday 30 March 1962 by Walter James, Editor of the Times Educational Supplement, together with Major PD Birchall, Chairman of the County Education Committee and Mrs Margaret Hills, Chairman of the School Governors.

The school has playing fields, including cricket nets, rugby and football pitches, a full size running track, tennis courts and a hockey redgra. The school has a  heated indoor swimming-pool, and in 1997 opened a fully fitted sports centre including a dance room, gym and large sprung-floor hall. Cross-country running also commonly takes place across the nearby Randwick hills.

Archway has its own sixth form which was part of the Stroud Post-16 Consortium along with Downfield Sixth Form (a collaboration between Marling School and Stroud High School) and South Gloucestershire and Stroud College.

The sports centre includes the "Jack Russell Lounge," named after famous former student the England wicket keeper Robert "Jack" Russell.

David Drew, former MP for Stroud, visited the school.

Use in film
The BBC's 'The Casual Vacancy' was filmed at the school in 2014.

Notable alumni

 Mike Cook
 Stuart Nelson, goalkeeper
 Jack Russell (cricketer, born 1963)
 Tom Smith (musician)
Luke Jerram (Artist)
John Simpson (Artist)
Tamsin Malleson (Actor)

References

External links
 Archway School

Stroud
Secondary schools in Gloucestershire
Community schools in Gloucestershire